The Macedonian Ice Hockey Federation (Hokej Federacija na Makedonija) is the governing body of ice hockey in North Macedonia.

References

External links
 Official website

Ice hockey in North Macedonia
Ice hockey governing bodies in Europe
International Ice Hockey Federation members
Ice hockey